Danyang was the first capital of the State of Chu.  It is  located near modern-day Xichuan County in Henan Province.

Following a number of battles with neighboring states the Chu capital moved to Ying, near modern-day Jingzhou City on the Jianghan Plain in the western part of Hubei Province.

Cultural relics from Xichuan Chu tomb

References

External links
Xichuan Chu tomb

Zhou dynasty
Chu (state)
Jianghan Plain